The École nationale des sciences appliquées de Marrakech (ENSA Marrakech) is a public institution of higher education. It was created in 2000 by the Ministry of Higher Education, Staff Training and Scientific Research and is a component of the University Cadi Ayyad in Marrakech and part of the ENSAs 

It is part of the diversification of training courses within the University, and boosting the socio-economic and industrial region.

Programmes offered
Computer engineering
Telecommunication and Networks engineering
Electrical engineering
Industrial engineering and logistics

External links
 Site officiel

Education in Morocco
Marrakesh
Engineering universities and colleges